Francis "Frannie"/"Franny" Jarvis (born ) is a former professional rugby league footballer who played in the 1970s and 1980s.

Playing career

Player's No.6 Trophy Final appearances
Francis Jarvis played  in Bradford Northern's 3-2 victory over Widnes in the 1974–75 Player's No.6 Trophy Final during the 1974–75 season at Wilderspool Stadium, Warrington on Saturday 25 January 1975.

Club career
Francis Jarvis made his début for Bradford Northern against Whitehaven at Odsal Stadium on Saturday 3 February 1973, he made his debut for Featherstone Rovers on 20 August 1978, and he played his last match for Featherstone Rovers during the 1980–81 season.

Administration
Francis Jarvis is, as of 2011, the administrator of the rugby league club Undercliffe Wildboars ARLFC (in Bolton and Undercliffe, Bradford, of the Pennine League).

Genealogical information
Francis Jarvis' marriage to Carol was registered during the third quarter of 1980 in Bradford district.

References

External links
 
Photograph "Francis Jarvis Debut - Francis Jarvis makes his senior debut for the last six minutes of Northern's cup tie against Whitehaven at Odsal. - 03/02/1973" at rlhp.co.uk
Photograph "Roy Castle meets the players - The players meet Roy Castle prior to the Final. - 11/05/1973" at rlhp.co.uk
Photograph "Young hooker Jarvis, Other Nationalities player" at rlhp.co.uk
Photograph "Big Jim - Big Jim Mills tries to force his way through the Northern defence. - 22/09/1974" at rlhp.co.uk
Photograph "Forsyth scores between the sticks - It is a try this time as prop Colin Forsyth grounds the ball near the Widnes posts with Mick Blacker and Francis Jarvis in support. - 22/09/1974" at rlhp.co.uk
Photograph "Daylight training - Daylight training before the 3rd Round Cup game v. Featherstone. - 08/03/1974" at rlhp.co.uk
Photograph "Francis Jarvis takes a knock - Frannie Jarvis receives treatment after scoring his 11th senior try of the season at Blackpool. - 31/03/1974" at rlhp.co.uk
Photograph "A brawl at Odsal - One of several brawls which marred the cup tie at Odsal v Bramley. - 01/09/1975" at rlhp.co.uk
Photograph "Francis Jarvis celebrates - Francis Jarvis celebrates scoring a try against Leeds at Headingley - 06/09/1975" at rlhp.co.uk
Photograph "Northern prepare to pack down - Northern prepare to pack down v. Leeds at Odsal. - 13/09/1975" at rlhp.co.uk
Photograph "Joe Phillips memorial trophy team 1975 - The team for the Joe Phillips Memorial Trophy game v. New Hunslet in 1975. - 10/08/1975" at rlhp.co.uk
Photograph "A snowy New Years Day - A snowy New Years Day at Odsal v. Castleford. - 01/01/1976" at rlhp.co.uk
Photograph "Francis Jarvis Post-match - Francis Jarvis leaves the field after the game against Huddersfield at Odsal - 24/10/1976" at rlhp.co.uk
Photograph "Jarvis Races Over - Hooker Jarvis races over for his try at Halifax. - 15/08/1976" at rlhp.co.uk
Photograph "Ouch! - Frannie Jarvis runs in with his head and lifts the Featherstone player in the air. - 21/08/1977" at rlhp.co.uk
Photograph "Let's celebrate - Northern players celebrate. - 13/11/1977" at rlhp.co.uk
Photograph "Graeme Evans - Graeme Evans on the charge. - 02/10/1977" at rlhp.co.uk
Photograph "Franny Jarvis held - Franny Jarvis is held a foot short of the Leeds line. - 19/03/1978" at rlhp.co.uk

Living people
Bradford Bulls players
Featherstone Rovers players
Halifax R.L.F.C. players
Huddersfield Giants coaches
Other Nationalities rugby league team players
Place of birth missing (living people)
Rugby league hookers
Rugby league locks
Rugby league second-rows
Year of birth missing (living people)